NP may refer to:

Arts and entertainment
 NP (novel), by Japanese author Banana Yoshimoto

Organizations
 Nashua-Plainfield Community School District, Iowa, United States
 National Party (disambiguation), various political parties
 Ngee Ann Polytechnic, Singapore
 Nigeria Police Force
 Northern Pacific Railway (AAR reporting mark NP)
 November Project, free, open-to-the-public exercise group

Places
 NP postcode area, Newport, Wales, UK
 Nepal (ISO 3166-1 alpha-2 country code NP)
 .np, the country code top level domain (ccTLD) for Nepal

Science, technology and mathematics

Biology and medicine
 Nucleoside phosphorylase, an enzyme
 Nurse practitioner
 Kallikrein 8, an enzyme
 Neptunium, symbol Np, a chemical element
 Nosocomial pneumonia
 Natriuretic peptide

Mathematics and computer science
 NP (complexity), Nondeterministic Polynomial, a computational complexity class
 NP-complete, a class of decision problems
 NP-hard, a class of problems in computational complexity
 Co-NP, a complexity class
 Numpy a Python mathematical library
 Named Pipe a method for Inter-Process Communications (IPC)

Physics and chemistry
 NP junction or PN junction in a semiconductor device
 Neper (Np), a logarithmic unit for ratios
 Neptunium, a chemical element with symbol Np
 Power number (Np), relating resistance force to inertia force
 Phosphorus nitride

Other uses in science and technology
 New Proposal, in the International Organization for Standardization (ISO) standardization process
 Not placed, a term used in printed circuit board design to denote the omitting of a component
 Nanoparticle
 Noun phrase, in grammar

Other uses
 No problem
 Notary public, post-nominal

See also

 
 
 Enpi (disambiguation)
 NPS (disambiguation)
 PN (disambiguation)
 N (disambiguation)
 P (disambiguation)